Anarkul (also Romanized as Anārkūl) is a village in Rahmatabad Rural District, Rahmatabad and Blukat District, Rudbar County, Gilan Province, Iran. At the 2006 census, its population was 181, in 63 families.

References 

Populated places in Rudbar County